The men's sabre A wheelchair fencing competition at the 2012 Summer Paralympics was held on 6 September at the ExCeL Exhibition Centre.

The tournament started with a group phase round-robin followed by a knockout stage.

During a qualification round-robin, bouts lasted a maximum of three minutes, or until one athlete had scored five hits. There was then a knockout phase, in which bouts lasted a maximum of nine minutes (three periods of three minutes), or until one athlete had scored 15 hits.

The event was won by Chen Yijun, representing .

Results

Preliminaries

Pool A

Pool B

Pool C

Competition bracket

References

M